"Woman" is a song by American rapper and singer Doja Cat from her third studio album Planet Her (2021). It has been described as a fusion of Afrobeats, pop, and R&B, with the lyrical themes of divine femininity and feminism. After gaining popularity in Europe, where it entered the top 10 in countries like Greece, France, Denmark, Switzerland, Lithuania and Portugal, the song impacted Italian radio airplay as the album's fourth single on October 1, 2021. It was sent to American rhythmic contemporary radio on January 11, 2022. The song was a sleeper success, spending several months on the charts before slowly climbing to the Top 10. For the chart dated May 7, 2022, the song reached number seven on the Billboard Hot 100, nearly a year after it debuted. "Woman" received three nominations at the 65th Annual Grammy Awards including Record of the Year, Best Pop Solo Performance and Best Music Video.

Composition 
Music journalists have called the song "an empowering, unabashed ode to womanhood and feminine diversity" which also "explores [the] thoughts, emotions and woes of being a woman". A bright, high-energy Afrobeats song, it has also been described as a fusion of pop, R&B, and reggae. It was co-written by American rapper Jidenna who also provides background vocals to the track. In the lyrics, Doja Cat also details how patriarchy often tries to create competition by putting women against each other, and thus makes a reference to Regina George from Mean Girls (2004). Critics compared her vocal delivery on the track to that of Rihanna (whom she name-drops in the song), and her rap delivery to that of  Kendrick Lamar.

Critical reception 
Rosemary Akpan of Exclaim! wrote that "in typical Doja fashion, she's still able to deliver her usual quick-witted bars, complemented by a catchy chorus."

Music video
The song's music video was released on December 3, 2021. It takes inspiration from Michael Jackson's video "Remember the Time." It stars Teyana Taylor alongside actress and model Guetcha. The plot elements and setting of the video take inspiration from the film Dune. In collaboration with Girls Who Code, "Woman" became the first codable music video in which fans will be able to make their own edits in JavaScript, Python or CSS using DojaCode.

Charts

Weekly charts

Year-end charts

Certifications

Release history

References

2021 singles
2021 songs
Doja Cat songs
Songs written by Doja Cat
Songs written by Yeti Beats
Song recordings produced by Yeti Beats
Kemosabe Records singles
RCA Records singles
Songs with feminist themes
American reggae songs